A vision quest is a Native American rite of passage.

Vision Quest may also refer to:

 Vision Quest (novel), a 1979 novel by Terry Davis
 Vision Quest (film), a 1985 American drama film based on the novel
 Vision Quest (TV series), an upcoming series in the Marvel Cinematic Universe
 "Vision Quest", a comic storyline in West Coast Avengers by Marvel Comics

Music
 Vision Quest Records, a Japanese record label
 Vision Quest (album), a 2001 album by jazz flautist Nicole Mitchell
 "Vision Quest", a song by Clutch from the 2018 album Book of Bad Decisions